This is a list of notable recording studios in the United Kingdom, arranged in alphabetical order by studio.

A 
Air Studios - Lyndhurst Hall, London, England
Abbey Road Studios - St. John's Wood, London, England
Acer Studios - Greater Manchester, England 
Angel Recording Studios - London, England
Associated Independent Recording (also known as AIR) - Westminster, London, England
Astoria Studio - Richmond upon Thames, London, England

B 
Basing Street Studios - London, England
Blackwing Studios - London, England
Boatyard Music & Film Studio - Wales
Brighton Electric - Brighton, England
Britannia Row Studios - London, England
British Grove Studios - London, England

C 
Cargo Studios - Greater Manchester, England
Castle of Doom Studios - Glasgow, Scotland
CaVa Studios - Glasgow, Scotland
Chipping Norton Recording Studios - Oxfordshire, England

E 
Eden Studios - London, England
Eel Pie Studios - London, England

F 
Fairview Studios - Willerby, Hull, England
The Farm - Chiddingfold, England
Forbidden London - London, England

G 
Gooseberry Sound Studios, London, England

H 
Headley Grange - East Hampshire, England

I 
IBC Studios - London, England
Island Studios - London, England

K 
 Konk Studios - London, England

L 
 Livingston Recording Studios - London, England

M 
 Marcus Recording Studios, Notting Hill, London, England
 Marcus Recording Studios, Fulham, London, England
The Manor Studio, Oxfordshire, England
Mayfair Studios - London, England
Metropolis Group, London, England
Miloco Studios, London, England
Monnow Valley Studio, Rockfield, Monmouth, Wales
Morgan Studios, London, England

N 
Nemo Studios - London, England

O 
Olympic Studios - London, England

R 
RAK Studios - London, England
Real World Studios - founded by Peter Gabriel
Ridge Farm Studio - West Sussex, England
RG Jones Studios - Morden, Surrey
Rockfield Studios - Monmouth, Wales
Ronnie Lane's Mobile Studio

S 
Sarm Studios - London, England
Sawmills Studio, Golant - Cornwall, England
Sound Techniques - London, England
Strawberry Studios (also known as Inner City Studios) - Stockport, England
Sphere Studios - London, England / Los Angeles, USA

T 
The Church Studios - London, England
Toe Rag Studios - Hackney, London, England
Trident Studios - London, England
Townhouse Studios - London, England

W 
Wessex Sound Studios - Highbury New Park, London
The Wool Hall -  Beckington, near Bath, Somerset

See also 
List of U.S. recording studios

References

 
Recording studios